Kainakary North is a village in Alappuzha district in the Indian state of Kerala.

Demographics
 India census, Kainakary North had a population of 8961 with 4501 males and 4460 females.

References

Villages in Alappuzha district